iii Records is a Japanese record label founded in 1999 and dedicated to issuing music from jazz to classical with focus on avant-garde and experimental directions. The label's list consists of artists such as:

OGOGO, 
Igor Grigoriev, 
Rod Oakes, 
Ira Schulman.

See also
 List of record labels: I–Q

External links
 III Records Promoting Jazz and Avant-Garde music

Record labels established in 1999
Experimental music record labels
1999 establishments in Japan